Hiram Hunter (10 February 1874 – 9 May 1966) was a New Zealand politician and trade unionist.

Early life
Born in Christchurch in 1874, Hunter was a farmer, storekeeper, carter, and trade unionist.

Political career
His best result was losing by 136 votes in 1911 in a close three-way contest, and failing to qualify for the subsequent run-off election by just four votes. He was President of the LRC (1911–1913) and of the Social Democratic Party (1913–1915). In , he contested the Mid-Canterbury electorate as an Independent Labour candidate against Jeremiah Connolly, but was unsuccessful.

During the 1930s, Hunter became increasingly disillusioned with the NZ Labour Party and argued that: "We have learned much of socialisation through its application in Russia. The result has been servility for the workers under the domination of dictators and, what seemed a book of beautiful ideal in 1915 has turned out to be in practice, a horrible reality". In 1938 he stood for the conservative National Party against his former Labour comrade Dan Sullivan who beat him by a three to one margin, with the election-night crowd booing him so loudly his speech could not be heard leaving Hunter with an undignified end to his public career.

Hiram Hunter was a member of the Christchurch City Council for ten years (1911–1915; 1917–1923).

Death
Hunter died in 1966 at Ashburton.

Notes

References

1874 births
1966 deaths
Burials at Memorial Park Cemetery, Christchurch
Christchurch City Councillors
New Zealand businesspeople
New Zealand farmers
New Zealand trade unionists
People from Christchurch
Unsuccessful candidates in the 1938 New Zealand general election
New Zealand National Party politicians
Unsuccessful candidates in the 1931 New Zealand general election
Unsuccessful candidates in the 1911 New Zealand general election
Unsuccessful candidates in the 1914 New Zealand general election
Unsuccessful candidates in the 1919 New Zealand general election
Social Democratic Party (New Zealand) politicians
New Zealand Labour Party politicians